"My Prayer" is a 1939 popular song with music by salon violinist Georges Boulanger and lyrics by Carlos Gomez Barrera and Jimmy Kennedy. It was originally written by Boulanger with the title Avant de mourir (Before dying) 1926. The lyrics for this version were added by Kennedy in 1939.

Glenn Miller recorded the song that year for a number two  hit and The Ink Spots' version featuring Bill Kenny reached number three, as well, that year. It has been recorded many times since, but the biggest hit version was a doo-wop rendition in 1956 by The Platters, whose single release reached number one on the Billboard Top 100 in the summer, and ranked four for the year. This version also went to #1 on both the R&B Airplay and R&B Juke Box chart.

The Platters recording features in the 2008 film The Curious Case of Benjamin Button, in the 1985 film Mischief, in the 1999 film October Sky, and in two episodes of the 2017 series of Twin Peaks. The Ink Spots' version of the song was featured in the 1992 movie Malcolm X. Vera Lynn sang the song in the British film One Exciting Night in 1944.

The song also became a tango in the Italian version by Norma Bruni and Cinico Angelini's orchestra (1940), "Sì, voglio vivere ancor!".

Recordings 

Ambrose (1939)
Denny Dennis recorded June 17, 1939
Glenn Miller and His Orchestra (1939)
The Ink Spots feat. Bill Kenny (1939)
Vera Lynn recorded July 5, 1939 with Fela Sowande (Organ) and issued on Decca F 7120.
Dick Haymes (1951) included in the compilation album Polka Dots & Moonbeams (1987)<ref>{{cite web|title=Discogs.com|url=https://www.discogs.com/Dick-Haymes-Polka-Dots-Moonbeams/master/1017991|website=Discogs.com|accessdate=May 19, 2017}}</ref>
The Orioles (1951)
Rosita Serrano, German lyrics by Curth Flatow entitled "Eine Saite zersprang". Rosita Serrano with Kurt Wege's orchestra Violin solo: Barnabas Bakos recorded it in Berlin on November 22, 1951. The song was released by Electrola as catalog number EG 7702. Serrano also performed it in the West German film Dark Eyes (Schwarze Augen)
Patti Page (1955) included in the compilation album Golden Memories (1982)
Edna Savage (1956) (Parlophone R4226)
Ronnie Hilton included in his album England's Ronnie Hilton (1958)
Franck Pourcel (1958)
Jimmie Rodgers for his album The Number One Ballads (1959)
Sue Raney - Songs for A Raney Day (1960)
Brenda Lee for her album All Alone Am I (1963)
Pat Boone (1964)
P.J. Proby (1964)
Bing Crosby included in his album Bing Crosby's Treasury - The Songs I Love (1965)
Shelley Fabares (1965)
The Honeycombs (1965)
Vikki Carr for her album The Way of Today! (1966)
Tom Jones in the album From the Heart (1966)
Jerry Vale for his album It's Magic (1966)
Eva Olmerová (1968)
Jay and the Americans (1969)
Mantovani (1971)
Mike Brant (1972)
Solomon Burke (1973)
Narvel Felts (1976)
Harry Connick Jr. for his album Only You (2004)
John Lloyd Young  "My Turn..."  (2014)
Chet Atkins
Dee Dee Bridgewater in her album Dee Dee Bridgewater'' (1976)
Glen Campbell
Frank Chacksfield
Ray Conniff
Johnny Desmond
Jimmy Dorsey
Ella Fitzgerald
The Four Seasons
Roy Hamilton
Lionel Hampton
Chick Henderson
Engelbert Humperdinck
Leslie (Hutch) Hutchinson
Jack Hylton
Bert Kaempfert
Anita Kerr Singers
Gene Krupa
Joe Longthorne
Joe Loss
Johnny Maestro & the Brooklyn Bridge
Dean Martin
Gerry Monroe
Wayne Newton
Roy Orbison
Esther Phillips
Gene Pitney
The Platters
The Righteous Brothers
Bobby Vee
The Vibrants
Victor Wood
Los Zafiros

References

1939 songs
1939 singles
1956 singles
Songs with lyrics by Jimmy Kennedy
The Platters songs
Glenn Miller songs
The Ink Spots songs
The Moments songs
Billboard Top 100 number-one singles
Mercury Records singles